Olga Malinkiewicz (born 26 November 1982) is a Polish physicist, inventor of a method of producing solar cells based on perovskites using inkjet printing. She is a co-founder and the Chief Technology Officer at Saule Technologies.

Biography 
She started her studies at the Faculty of Physics at the University of Warsaw, where she obtained a Bachelor in 2005. She graduated from the Barcelona University of Technology in Barcelona in 2010. While still a student, in 2009 she started working at the ICFO Institute. In 2017, she obtained her PhD from ICMol – Institute for Molecular Science of the University of Valencia at the group of Dr. Henk Bolink, with a thesis on low cost, efficient hybrid solar cells. In 2014 she founded Saule Technologies, with private backing and turned down an offer of €1 million (US$1.3 million) for 10% of the start-up. The name of the company derives from Saulė, the goddess of the Sun in Baltic mythology.

Awards 
During her studies, Olga developed a novel perovskite solar cell architecture allowing the fabrication of such devices at low temperatures for the first time, while retaining high efficiency. She has been granted with the Photonics21 Student Innovation award in a competition organised by the European Commission in 2014 for this achievement. She published an article on the subject in Nature Scientific Reports. In 2015 Olga was honored with an award in the Innovators Under 35 ranking, organized by MIT Technology Review for "developing a new technology that could spark a “social revolution” in renewable energies". In 2016, she was awarded the Knight's Cross of the Order of Polonia Restituta by the President of Poland Andrzej Duda for her "outstanding contributions to the development of Polish science". For her future science and business activities, she was distinguished by the American Chemical Society as one of the top women entrepreneurs in new technologies.

Professional life 
In 2015,  she co-founded Saule Technologies (named after the Baltic sun goddess), along with two Polish businessmen. A partnership was signed in January 2018 with the Swedish construction company Skanska. The company is also looking for partnership with other companies operating in the Middle East. It is also working with Egis Group, a rigid plastics film producer, on the encapsulation of the cells. In 2021, the company became the world’s first to begin industrial production of solar panels based on next generation perovskite technology  and unveiled the first building in the world using this pioneering photovoltaic installation.

See also 
 List of Poles
 Timeline of Polish science and technology

References 

1982 births
Living people
21st-century Polish businesspeople
21st-century Polish physicists
Polish women physicists
21st-century Polish women scientists
Women physicists
University of Warsaw alumni
University of Valencia alumni
Polish inventors